Mikuláš Tóth (10 August 1833 – 21 May 1882) was a Slovak Greek Catholic hierarch. He was the bishop of Slovak Catholic Eparchy of Prešov from 1876 to 1882.

Born in Mukacheve, Austrian Empire (present day – Ukraine) in the Ruthenian family in 1833, he was ordained a priest on 18 December 1857 for the Ruthenian Catholic Eparchy of Mukacheve. He was appointed as the Bishop of Eparchy by the Holy See on 3 April 1876. He was consecrated to the Episcopate on 21 May 1876. The principal consecrator was Bishop Ivan Pasteliy, and the principal co-consecrator was Bishop Juraj Čásky.

He died unexpected in Prešov on 21 May 1882.

References 

1833 births
1882 deaths
19th-century Eastern Catholic bishops
Slovak Greek Catholic bishops